This article details the qualifying phase for triathlon at the 2024 Summer Olympics. The competition at these Games will comprise a total of 110 athletes coming from their respective NOCs with a maximum of three per gender. All athletes must undergo a qualifying pathway to earn a spot for the Games through the World Triathlon Mixed Relay Championships (2022 and 2023), the Olympic Qualification Event, the Continental Qualification, and the Olympic Qualification List which began on 27 May 2022 and then concludes two years later on the same date.

Summary
Ten NOCs will each earn four quota spots (two per gender) through the mixed relay qualification pathway. As the host country, France reserves four quota places (two per gender) while the highest-ranked eligible NOC will each obtain two men's and two women's spots at the 2022 and 2023 Mixed Relay World Championships. The six highest-ranked NOCs will be allocated the same number of places based on the World Triathlon mixed relay rankings of 25 March 2024 with the remaining two teams notching the Olympic quota places through the Mixed Relay Olympic Qualification Event to be held between 15 April to 27 May 2024.

The individual rankings of 27 May 2024 will provide 31 athletes in each gender with the coveted quota places. Twenty-six of them will be sequentially allocated to the highest-ranked triathletes, subject to a limit of three per NOC (if all three are placed inside the top 30) or two per NOC (if the third would be placed outside the top 30). Any NOC qualifying through the mixed relay must ignore its two highest-ranked triathletes in each gender. One additional spot per continent will be assigned to the highest-ranked remaining triathlete whose NOC has not yet qualified for any quota places. A team consisting of two individuals in both the men's and women's events will be eligible to join the ten previously qualified teams in the mixed relay event.

The final two spots per gender are awarded to the triathletes under the Tripartite Commission and to those eligible in the top 180 of the World Triathlon individual rankings.

Timeline

Men's

Women's

References

Qualification for the 2024 Summer Olympics
Triathlon at the 2024 Summer Olympics